Karašica is a river in eastern Croatia whose length, combined with its tributary Vučica is , and whose basin covers .

Karašica and Vučica rise in the mountain of Papuk and flow towards the northeast into a plain, where they meander in an eastward direction. Vučica discharges into Karašica between Valpovo and Ladimirevci and the river flows into the Drava north of Josipovac.

There are several suggested etymologies for the name "Karašica". It's not explainable in Croatian. One is that it comes from the Turkish words "kara su" (black stream). Second is that it comes from the Latin word "Carassius", denoting several species of freshwater fish. Perhaps the most likely one is that it comes from the Indo-European root *(s)ker, meaning "to cut", in the sense "the river that cuts through the valley".

References

Rivers of Croatia
Slavonia